Ashley Lahey (born 26 October 1999) is an American tennis player.

Lahey has a career-high singles ranking of 339 by the WTA, achieved on 6 February 2023. She also has a career-high WTA doubles ranking of 212, achieved on the same date.

Lahey won her first major ITF title at the 2022 Christus Health Pro Challenge, in the doubles draw, partnering Maria Kozyreva.

Lahey played college tennis at Pepperdine University.

ITF finals

Singles: 3 (1 title, 2 runner-ups)

Doubles: 7 (3 titles, 4 runner-ups)

References

External links
 
 

1999 births
Living people
American female tennis players
Sportspeople from Hawthorne, California
Pepperdine Waves women's tennis players